Matteo Giampaolo Vitaioli (born 27 October 1989) is a Sammarinese footballer who plays for Tropical Coriano as a striker.

Career
Born in Fiorentino, San Marino, Vitaioli has represented three clubs on a permanent basis: San Marino Calcio, F.C. Fiorentino, Sammaurese and Tropical Coriano and has played for four clubs on loan: Empoli (although he failed to make a single league appearance in the second half of 2005–06 Serie A), ASD Cagliese, Real Montecchio and P.D. Castellarano.

He was considered to be one of the most promising young talents in the San Marino national football team, often regarded as a key member of the squad, partnering with Andy Selva and Nicola Ciacci in a three-pronged San Marino attack.

He has won 81 caps to date and scored his first goal on 8 September 2015, in a European Championship qualifier away to Lithuania. It was San Marino's first away goal in 14 years.

He wears the number 11 shirt for both club and country.

International goals
Scores and results list San Marino's goal tally first.

References

1989 births
Living people
People from Fiorentino
Sammarinese footballers
San Marino international footballers
Association football forwards
A.S.D. Victor San Marino players
F.C. Fiorentino players
P.D. Castellarano players